Jesse Root Grant II (February 6, 1858 – June 8, 1934) was an American politician. He was the youngest son of President Ulysses S. Grant and First Lady Julia Grant. He joined the Democratic Party and quixotically sought the party nomination for President, running against William Jennings Bryan in 1908. In 1925, he wrote a biography of his father.

Biography
Jesse Root Grant II was born near St. Louis, Missouri to Ulysses S. Grant and Julia Grant he was named after his grandfather Jesse Root Grant I . He studied engineering at Cornell University and also attended Columbia Law School before settling in California. In addition to practicing law, he was involved in several mining ventures as an engineer, stockholder, board of directors member and corporate officer. For several years he managed his brother Ulysses Jr.'s U.S. Grant Hotel in San Diego. In the 1890s, he helped to develop Tia Juana, now Tijuana, Mexico, as a gambling resort.

In 1880, he married Elizabeth Chapman (1858-1945), daughter of William Chapman, one of the founders of California Academy of Sciences. They had two children: Chapman Grant and Nellie Grant. In 1913, Grant sued for divorce while they were living in Goldfield, Nevada. Mrs. Grant strenuously fought his charges of desertion. She countersued, claiming he had deserted her and refused to support the family. The divorce was followed by the newspapers. When the divorce was finally granted in 1918, Grant married a widow, Lillian Burns Wilkins.   
 American internet celebrity, Caroline Calloway, is a descendant of Wilkins. 

Grant died in Los Altos, California in 1934 and was buried at the cemetery at the Presidio of San Francisco. He was the last surviving child of Ulysses S. Grant.

Political and literary career

Grant joined the Democratic party and was a candidate for the Democratic presidential nomination in 1908, though he was not considered a viable contender. In 1925, he wrote a biography of his father, In the Days of My Father General Grant.

References

1858 births
1934 deaths
Grant
Children of presidents of the United States
Cornell University College of Engineering alumni
Ulysses S. Grant
Grant family
Writers from Missouri
Missouri Democrats
California Democrats
Columbia Law School alumni
20th-century American biographers